The 1976 World Field Archery Championships were held in Mölndal, Sweden.

Medal summary (Men's individual)

Medal summary (Women's individual)

Medal summary (team events)
No team event held at this championships.

References

E
1976 in Swedish sport
International archery competitions hosted by Sweden
World Field Archery Championships